Bernard Bergonzi FRSL (13 April 1929 – 20 September 2016) was a British literary scholar, critic, and poet. He was Emeritus Professor of English at the University of Warwick and an expert on T. S. Eliot.

He was born in London and studied at Wadham College, Oxford. He had an academic position in Manchester before moving to Warwick, and held visiting professorships at American universities.

Works

Godolphin and Other Poems (Latin Press, 1952)
Descartes and the Animals - Poems 1948-54 (1954)
The Fantasy Poets: Number 34 (Fantasy Press 1957) with Dennis Keene and Oscar Mellor
The Early H. G. Wells: A Study of The Scientific Romances (1961)
L.P.Hartley and Anthony Powell (1962) with Paul Bloomfield, British Council, Writers and Their Work #144, revised 1971 as Bergonzi on Powell
Heroes' Twilight. A Study of the Literature of the Great War (1965) revised 1980
An English Sequence (1966) poems
Innovations: Where is our Culture Going? (1968) editor, with Marshall Mcluhan, Frank Kermode, Leslie Fiedler
Great Short Works of Aldous Huxley (1969) editor
T.S.Eliot: Four Quartets (1969) editor, essays
The Situation of the Novel (1970)
"The Twentieth Century" (1970) editor, Volume 7 of the Sphere History of Literature in the English Language
Memorials (1970) poems
T. S. Eliot (1972)
The Turn of a Century - Essays on Victorian and Modern English Literature (1973)
H. G. Wells - A Collection of Critical Essays (1976) editor
Gerard Manley Hopkins (1977)
Reading the Thirties (1978)
Years (Mandeville Press 1979) poems 
The Roman Persuasion (1981) novel
The Myth of Modernism and Twentieth Century Literature (1986)
A Short History of English Literature (1990) revision of Ifor Evans
Exploding English: Criticism, Theory, Culture (OUP, 1991)
Wartime and Aftermath : English Literature and Its Background, 1939-60 (OUP, 1993)
David Lodge (1995)
War Poets and Other Subjects (1999)
A Victorian Wanderer. The Life of Thomas Arnold the Younger (OUP, 2003)
A Study in Greene (OUP, 2006)

References

Carcanet Press

1929 births
2016 deaths
English literary critics
English people of Italian descent
Fellows of the Royal Society of Literature
Academics of the University of Warwick
Alumni of Wadham College, Oxford
English male poets
English male non-fiction writers